Red River Wildlife Management Area at  is an Idaho wildlife management area in Idaho County near Elk City. It was purchased in 1993 from Don Wilkerson who offered it to the state to preserve it in a natural, undeveloped state. The property was acquired with the donations of $100,00 from the Rocky Mountain Elk Foundation, $100,000 from Trout Unlimited, and $287,000 in mitigation funds from the Bonneville Power Administration.

The WMA includes a meadow near the South Fork of the Clearwater River. White-tailed deer, moose, and elk are often found in the meadow.

References

Protected areas established in 1993
Protected areas of Idaho County, Idaho
Wildlife management areas of Idaho